Lahore is a 2010 Indian Hindi sports film that was released on 19 March 2010. It was directed by Sanjay Puran Singh Chauhan and produced by Vivek Khatkar, Jagat Singh Rana & Sunil Sharma, with Sai Om Films Pvt. Ltd.’s, and distributed by Warner Bros. Pictures. The movie is loosely based on the American martial arts movie Best of the Best.

The film stars debutants Aanaahad and Shraddha Das in lead roles and has veteran actors like Farooq Shaikh, Nafisa Ali, Nirmal Pandey, Sushant Singh, Sabyasachi Chakrabarty, Saurabh Shukla, Ashish Vidyarthi, Kelly Dorji, Mukesh Rishi, Jeeva, Shraddha Nigam in key roles.

Plot
An Indian kickboxer defeats a Pakistani kickboxer in an Asian kickboxing tournament. The event ends in a tragedy due to the Pakistani players' intemperance. The peace process initiated by the two countries struggles to gain its momentum. This is especially when the Indian hero's brother is determined to avenge his family and country during a second international bout that is being held in Lahore.

Cast
 Aanaahad as Veerender Singh
 Shraddha Das as Ida
 Farooq Shaikh as S K Rao
 Nafisa Ali as Amma
 Sushant Singh as Dheeru
 Shraddha Nigam as Neela Chaudhary
 Mukesh Rishi as Noor Mohammmad
 Sabyasachi Chakrabarty as Sikandar Hyaat Khan
 Kelly Dorji as Gajanan
 Jeeva as Kunjal Bhaskar Reddy
 Pramod Mouthu as Shahnawaz Qureshi
 Nirmal Pandey as Anwar Shaikh
 Saurabh Shukla as Madhav Suri
 Ashish Vidyarthi as Mohd. Akhtar
 Ram Awana as Iqbal Khan
 Karate Raja as C. Subramaniam

Production
The film was shot in Delhi, Mumbai, Lahore, Hyderabad, Ladakh, Lonavala, Malaysia, Bhiwandi, Chembur, Ghatkopar, and Chinchpokli.

Hong Kong stuntmaster Tony Leung Siu Hung was the action choreographer of Lahore. The background score was by Wayne Sharpe. Lisbeth Scott of Avatar, Munich, and Chronicles of Narnia fame has sung vocals for Lahore – her first Asian film. Rob Miller, who earlier won a Filmfare award for Chak De! India (2007), is Lahore'''s sports consultant. MM Kreem has done the music.

Home mediaLahore DVDs and VCDs are available in Hindi with English subtitles on Moserbaer Home Video. The DVD also features the making of the film.

Soundtrack
 "Ab Ye Kaafila" – KK, Karthik, M. M. Keeravani
 "Musafir" – Daler Mehndi
 "Rang De" – Shankar Mahadevan, Shilpa Rao
 "Saaware" – M. M. Keeravani
 "Musafir" – M. M. Keeravani
 "O Re Bande" – Rahat Fateh Ali Khan, Shilpa Rao
 "Lahore Theme" – Lisbeth Scott
 "Fitrat" – Surendra Chaturvedi (lyrics)

International awards and recognitionLahore'' has won international awards, including Special Jury Award at the 42nd WorldFest-Houston International Film Festival, Best Actor – Aanaahad at Tenerife International Film Festival (UK), Most Aspiring Film Maker (Sanjay Chauhan) at Filmmakers International Film Festival (UK), Best actor – Aanaahad – at Salento International Film Festival, Italy and had all six nominations at Asian Festival Of First Films, Singapore.

National film awards
After setting the international festival circuits ablaze, Lahore won two awards at the 57th National Film Awards, Indira Gandhi Award for Best Debut Film of a Director went to producer Vivek Khatkar and director Sanjay Puran Singh Chauhan while Farooque Shaikh won National Film Award for Best Supporting Actor.

Criticism
The film was not released in Pakistan as it was regarded there as portraying Pakistan in a bad light.

Other awards and nominations
6th Apsara Film & Television Producers Guild Awards
Nominated
 Apsara Award for Best Performance in a Supporting Role (Male) – Farouque Sheikh

2011 Zee Cine Awards
Nominated

 Star Screen Awards for Best Background Score 2010 – Wayne Sharpe
 Stardust Awards for Hottest New Director 2010 – Sanjay Puran Singh Chauhan

References

External links

Kickboxing for Peace
Lahore's been a perfect launch : Aanaahad
The film chose me
 9vn7RWZHiZ6hUORyQMPA== Kelly in Lahore
Punch Factor: Aanaahad Kicks Up Acclaim
Feluda In Lahore
 What I took back from the film is a son. Aanaahad still calls me amma. – Nafisa Ali 
 Aanaahad didn’t have time to look good!
Sushant Learning Kick Boxing For Lahore
Lahore SHoot Complete
 ‘Acting Is Not As Easy As Everyone Makes It Out To Be’

2010 films
2010s sports films
2010s Hindi-language films
Films scored by M. M. Keeravani
Indian boxing films
Films set in Lahore
Films shot in Ladakh
Films featuring a Best Supporting Actor National Film Award-winning performance
Film censorship in Pakistan
Film controversies in Pakistan
Films shot in Mumbai
Films shot in Delhi
Indian remakes of American films
Films shot in Lahore
Films shot in Hyderabad, India
Best Debut Feature Film of a Director National Film Award winners
India–Pakistan relations in popular culture
2010 directorial debut films
Warner Bros. films